is a Japanese castle in the city Akita, Akita Prefecture, Japan. Throughout the Edo period, Kubota Castle was home to the Satake clan, daimyō of Kubota Domain, rulers of northern Dewa Province. In the official documents of the Tokugawa shogunate, the castle was called , although this name is now more commonly used to refer to the Nara period fortified settlement of Akita Castle which was nearby.

Situation
Kubota Castle is a hirayama-style Japanese castle, built on a  hill on the left bank of the Nibetsu River (Asahi River), a tributary of the Omono River, incorporating the river and adjacent wetlands into its defenses. The main bailey was protected by a system of wet moats, earthenworks and eight yagura watchtowers; however, the castle made very little use of stone walls, which were not common in Hitachi Province, the previous homeland of the Satake clan. The castle also never had an imposing main keep, possibly to prevent attracting unwelcome suspicion from the Tokugawa shogunate.

History

As Kubota Castle
Satake Yoshinobu, was reassigned to Dewa Province from the clan's ancestral territories by Tokugawa Ieyasu in 1602, and arrived at the site of the Minato Castle in Tsuchizaki on September 17 of the same year. Work began immediately on the new castle, with the main bailey completed by August 28, 1604, and a surrounding castle town laid out. The town continued a planned expansion in 1607, 1619, 1629 and 1631 with a system of streets and moats. However, the castle burned down in a fire on September 21, 1633, during the tenure of Satake Yoshitaka. It was restored in 1635. The name "Kubota Castle" appears for the first time in official documents dated 1647.

Much of the castle town, as well as several castle gates and the daimyō palace, burned down in a fire on April 2, 1776. The main bailey was destroyed during a subsequent fire caused by a lightning strike on July 10, 1778. Repairs were completed by May 24, 1781. However, another fire on May 10, 1797, destroyed the northern keep, two yagura, two barracks and numerous minor buildings.

During the Boshin War of the Meiji Restoration in 1868, after some vacillation, the Kubota clan supported the new Meiji government and as a result came under attack by the forces of the Ōuetsu Reppan Dōmei, especially the forces from neighboring Shōnai Domain. After the end of the war, the castle was surrendered by the Satake clan to the new government on June 17, 1869. With the abolition of the han system in 1871, Kubota Domain was dissolved into Akita Prefecture, and Kubota Castle became the Prefectural Office. Following the relocation of the Akita Prefectural Office on March 13, 1872, the castle was abandoned. Subsequently, most of its moats were filled in to widen city streets, and most of its minor structures were pulled down for scrap. On July 21, 1880 a fire broke out in the abandoned main bailey, and destroyed it and most of the remaining structures. Only one small guardpost in the second bailey survived the fire. One of the remaining gates was removed to a local Buddhist temple in 1886. In 1890, the government returned the barren castle site back to the Satake clan, which subsequently donated the site of the main bailey and second bailey to Akita City for use as a park.

As Senshu Park
The Akita city government planted it with 1170 sakura trees in 1892 and built a Shinto shrine on the site of the Main Bailey. A Hachiman shrine was completed in the grounds in 1907 (the shrine burned down in 2005 and was rebuilt in 2007) and the Iyataka Jinja, a shrine dedicated to Hirata Atsutane. A number of civic buildings, including the Akita City Library, Akita Civic Center, Akita Museum of Art and forerunner of the Akita Omoriyama Zoo were built on the site. In 1984, the Satake clan donated the remaining 14.6 hectares of the former castle site to Akita City.

Present day
One of the corner yagura of the castle was reconstructed in 1989 to boost local tourism. It contains a small history museum. The front gate of the castle was reconstructed in 2001.

The site also contains the Satake Historical Material Museum, dedicated to the history of the Satake clan, and the former Kurosawa House, an Edo period samurai house, relocated to the park in 1988. The former Kurosawa House is registered as a national Important Cultural Property.

Literature

External links

Kubota Castle Jcastle Profile
Kuobat Castle at Japanese-Castle Explorer
Official home page

Notes

Castles in Akita Prefecture
Museums in Akita Prefecture
Buildings and structures in Akita (city)